Business Casual is the name of the fifth EP released by the indie rock band,  We Are Scientists.  It was released on October 14, 2013.

Track listing
 "Dumb Luck"  – 2:41
 "Return the Favor"  – 3:14
 "Good Answer"  – 3:41
 "Courage" (Demo)  – 2:11
 "Take My Breath Away"  – 5:29

External links
 Official website
 What's The Word

We Are Scientists albums
2013 EPs